The NBC superhero serial drama series Heroes follows the lives of people around the globe who possess various superhuman powers as they struggle to cope with their everyday lives and prevent foreseen disasters from occurring. The series premiered on American and Canadian television on September 25, 2006. The first season, which finished 21st of 142 American primetime television programs in Nielsen ratings, was released on DVD and HD DVD on August 28, 2007. The second season ranked 21st of 220 in the ratings, and was released on DVD and Blu-ray Disc on August 26, 2008, with the Blu-ray release of the first season. The third season aired in two blocks generally without reruns; it premiered on September 22, 2008, on NBC in the United States and on Global in Canada, with a one-hour clip-show and two regular episodes. The fourth season aired from September 21, 2009, to February 8, 2010. Although cast members had stated and speculated that there would be a fifth season, NBC announced on May 14, 2010, that the show was officially cancelled, but that the network was looking at plans to tie up some loose ends in either a miniseries or TV movie.

Within the seasons of Heroes are "volumes", which focus on shorter story arcs. The first season comprises a single volume of 23 episodes called Genesis, which is also the title of the pilot episode. The second season was designed to contain three volumes called Generations, Exodus, and Villains, but Exodus was scrapped due to viewer criticism and the 2007–08 Writers Guild of America strike. Villains was carried over to the show's third season, leaving the second season with only 11 episodes, 13 fewer than were originally ordered by NBC. The third season included 25 episodes, 13 episodes comprising Villains and 12 episodes in a volume titled Fugitives. The fourth season consisted of a fifth volume of 18 episodes titled Redemption. The final scene of the last episode began a sixth volume entitled Brave New World, which became the title of the first episode of Heroes Reborn.

Originally, the second season of Heroes was to be followed in April and May 2008 by six stand-alone episodes of a new series, Heroes: Origins, which was intended as an alternative to a long mid-season hiatus like the one that led to a drop in ratings for Heroes in its first season. The project, which was later planned to be 12 episodes, was indefinitely postponed due to a decline in viewership and the strike and was eventually cancelled to keep "the Heroes mothership as strong as possible," according to NBC co-chairman Ben Silverman. A series of three webisodes collectively titled Going Postal became available exclusively online in July 2008. Following the release of Going Postal, four more sets of webisodes were produced, titled Heroes: Destiny, The Recruit, Hard Knox, and Nowhere Man, which stars David H. Lawrence as Eric Doyle. On September 28, 2009, a new set of webisodes titled Slow Burn was released, starring members of the "Sullivan Bros. Carnival" from season four, Lydia, Edgar and Samuel. Slow Burn was set up as a Web Exclusive for the promotion of Sprint Now, and each webisode was released at the same time as the episodes of the main television series.

Series overview

Main series

Season 1 (2006–07)

Season 2 (2007)

Season 3 (2008–09)

Season 4 (2009–10)

Web-based minisodes

Going Postal

Heroes: Destiny

The Recruit

Hard Knox

Nowhere Man

Slow Burn

Ratings

Notes

References

External links 
  on NBC
 

 
Lists of American fantasy television series episodes
Lists of American science fiction television series episodes
Superhero science fiction web series